The Canal de la Sarre, originally called Canal des Houillères de la Sarre, connects the Canal de la Marne au Rhin in Gondrexange to the canalised river Sarre (German: Saar) in Sarreguemines in northeastern France. For convenience this entry covers the entire waterway in France, including the canalised river. The canal is 63 km long, and the French portion of the canalised river Sarre is 12 km long, making a total of 75 km, with respectively 28 and 2 locks.

History 
The canal was built to carry coal from the mines around Saarbrücken, hence its original name. After a private company failed in 1844, the State took over the project and started works in 1861, to be completed in 1867. Although predating the Freycinet programme by nearly 20 years, it was built directly to these dimensions, justified by the volume of coal to be exported from the Saar collieries in Germany. The river Saar downstream from Saarbrücken was unnavigable until the canalisation works were completed in 1986.

Development for tourism 
The canal is rural in character and charming throughout. Through navigation down to the Moselle near Trier, 90 km beyond Saarbrücken, is possible, thanks to canalisation of the Saar in Germany. The cross-border connection was blocked for two years following closure of the first lock in Germany, at Güdingen, but was expected to be reopened in 2017.

See also
 List of canals in France

References

External links
 List of locks
 Project Babel
 Canal de la Sarre with maps and detailed information on places, ports and moorings on the canal, by the author of Inland Waterways of France, 8th ed., 2010, Imray

Sarre
Canals opened in 1866
1866 establishments in France
CSaar